The Serie B 1934–35 was the sixth tournament of this competition played in Italy since its creation. This championship was organized with two groups.

Teams
Aquila Calcio, Pisa Calcio, Lucchese and Catania Calcio had been promoted from Prima Divisione, while Padova Calcio, Genoa CFC and Casale Calcio had been relegated from Serie A. Cagliari Calcio, Derthona, Vicenza Calcio and Venezia FC had been re-elected by the Higher Directory to expand the league.

Events
Eight teams for each group were relegated in order to restore the single table. Two teams (one for each group) retired during the tournament. In the Western group, A.C. Pavia retired after 20 days and only the matches played in the first half of the season (the andata) were considered valid. In the Eastern group Grion Pola retired after 15 matches and all their matches were voided.

Group A

Final classification

Results

Group B

Final classification

Results

Relegation tie-breaker
Played in Ancona on June 9

Played in Fano on June 16

U.S. Cremonese were relegated to Serie C.

Championship play-off

Genova 1893 were declared Serie B champions.

References and sources
Almanacco Illustrato del Calcio - La Storia 1898-2004, Panini Edizioni, Modena, September 2005

1934-1935
2
Italy